Bong Joon-ho (Hanja: 奉俊昊; born September 14, 1969) is a South Korean film director, producer and screenwriter. The recipient of four Academy Awards, his filmography is characterised by emphasis on social themes, genre-mixing, black humor, and sudden tone shifts.

He first became known to audiences and achieved a cult following with his directorial debut film, the black comedy Barking Dogs Never Bite (2000), before achieving both critical and commercial success with his subsequent films: the crime thriller Memories of Murder (2003), the monster film The Host (2006), the science fiction action film Snowpiercer (2013), which served as Bong's English language debut, and the near-universally acclaimed black comedy thriller Parasite (2019), all of which are among the highest-grossing films in South Korea, with Parasite also being the highest-grossing South Korean film in history.

All of Bong's films have been South Korean productions, although both Snowpiercer and Okja (2017) are mostly in the English language. Two of his films have screened in competition at the Cannes Film Festival—Okja in 2017 and Parasite in 2019; the latter earned the Palme d'Or, which was a first for a South Korean film. Parasite also became the first South Korean film to receive Academy Award nominations, with Bong winning Best Picture, Best Director, and Best Original Screenplay, making Parasite the first film in the award's history not in English to win Best Picture. In 2017, Bong was included on Metacritic's list of the 25 best film directors of the 21st century. In 2020, Bong was included in Times annual list of 100 Most Influential People and Bloomberg 50.

Early life
Bong Joon Ho was born in Daegu, South Korea and is the youngest of four children. His father, Bong Sang-gyun, was a first-generation graphic designer, industrial designer, and professor of art at Yeungnam University and the head of the art department at the National Film Institute; his mother, Park So-young, was a full-time housewife. His father retired from Seoul Institute of Technology as a professor of design in 2007 and died in 2017. Bong's maternal grandfather, Park Taewon, was an esteemed author during the Japanese colonial period, best known for his work A Day in the Life of Kubo the Novelist and his defection to North Korea in 1950. His older brother, Bong Joon-soo, is an English professor at the Seoul National University; his older sister, Bong Ji-hee, teaches fashion styling at Anyang University. Currently, Bong's son, Bong Hyo-Min, is also a film director.

While Bong was in elementary school, the family relocated to Seoul, taking up residence in Jamsil-dong by the Han River. In 1988, Bong enrolled in Yonsei University, majoring in sociology. College campuses such as Yonsei's were then hotbeds for the South Korean democracy movement; Bong was an active participant of student demonstrations, frequently subjected to tear gas early in his college years. He served a two-year term in the military in accordance with South Korea's compulsory military service before returning to college in 1992. Bong later co-founded a film club named "Yellow Door" with students from neighboring universities. As a member of the club, Bong made his first films, including a stop motion short titled Looking for Paradise and 16 mm film short titled Baeksaekin (White Man). He graduated from Yonsei University in 1995.

In the early 1990s, Bong completed a two-year program at the Korean Academy of Film Arts. While there, he made many 16 mm short films. His graduation films, Incoherence and Memories in My Frame, were invited to screen at the Hong Kong International Film Festival and Vancouver International Film Festival. Bong also collaborated on several works with his classmates, which included working as cinematographer on the highly acclaimed short 2001 Imagine (1994), directed by his friend Jang Joon-hwan. Aside from cinematography, Bong was also a lighting technician on two shorts—The Love of a Grape Seed and Sounds From Heaven and Earth—in 1994. Eventually, he suffered severe hardships for more than ten years while working on film production. In his early stages as a film director, Bong received a meager salary of US$1,900 per year (as 4,500,000 won, or US$3,800, every two years). It was hard for him to make a living and he barely made enough to buy rice, so he had to borrow rice from his university's alumni.

Career
After graduating, he spent the next five years contributing in various capacities to works by other directors. He received a partial screenplay credit on the anthology film Seven Reasons Why Beer is Better Than a Lover (1996); both screenplay and assistant director credits on Park Ki-yong's debut Motel Cactus (1997); and is one of four writers (along with Jang Joon-hwan) credited for the screenplay of Phantom: The Submarine (1999).

Early directing work
Shortly afterwards, Bong began shooting his first feature Barking Dogs Never Bite (2000) under producer Cha Seung-jae, who had overseen the production of both Motel Cactus and Phantom: The Submarine. The film, about a low-ranking university lecturer who abducts a neighbor's dog, was shot in the same apartment complex where Bong lived after his marriage. At the time of its release in February 2000, it received little commercial interest but some positive critical reviews. It was invited to the competition section of Spain's San Sebastián International Film Festival, and won awards at the Slamdance Film Festival and Hong Kong International Film Festival. Slowly building international word of mouth also helped the film financially; over two years after its local release, the film reached its financial break-even point due to sales to overseas territories.

Bong's second film, Memories of Murder (2003), a much larger project, was adapted from a stage play centered on a real-life serial killer who terrorized a rural town in the 1980s and was never caught (although a suspect confessed to the crime in 2019). Production of the film was a difficult process (the film set a local record for the number of locations it used). It was released in April 2003 and proved a critical and popular success. Word of mouth drove the film to sell over five million tickets (rescuing Cha Seung-jae's production company Sidus from near-bankruptcy), and a string of local honors followed, including Best Picture, Best Director, Best Actor (for Song Kang-Ho) and Best Lighting prizes at the Grand Bell Awards in 2003. Although passed over by the Cannes Film Festival and Venice Film Festival, the film eventually received its international premiere, again at the San Sebastián International Film Festival, where it picked up three awards including Best Director. The film also received an unusually strong critical reception on its release in foreign territories, such as France and the U.S.

Following this, Bong took some time to contribute short films to two anthology film projects. Influenza (2004) is a 30-minute work acted out entirely in front of real CCTV cameras stationed throughout Seoul. The film, which charts a desperate man's turn to violent crime over the space of five years, was commissioned by the Jeonju International Film Festival, together with works by Japanese director Sogo Ishii and Hong Kong-based Yu Lik-wai. Twentidentity, meanwhile, is a 20-part anthology film made by alumni of the Korean Academy of Film Arts, on the occasion of the school's 20th anniversary. Bong's contribution is Sink & Rise (2003), a work set alongside the Han River.

International success
The Host (2006) marked a step up in scale in Bong's career, and indeed for the Korean film industry as a whole. The big-budget ($12 million) work centered on a fictional monster that rises up out of the Han River to wreak havoc on the people of Seoul—and on one family in particular. Featuring many of the actors who had appeared in his previous films, the film was the focus of strong audience interest even before it started shooting, but there were many doubts raised about whether a Korean production could rise to the challenge of creating a full-fledged, believable digital monster. After initially contacting New Zealand's Weta Digital—the company responsible for the CGI in The Lord of the Rings—scheduling conflicts led Bong to San Francisco-based The Orphanage, who took on the majority of the effects work. After rushing to meet deadlines, the film received a rapturous premiere in the Directors' Fortnight section of the 2006 Cannes Film Festival. Although local audiences were slightly more critical of The Host than attendees at Cannes, the film was nonetheless a major summer hit. With theater owners calling for more and more prints, the film enjoyed South Korea's widest release ever (on over a third of the nation's 1,800 screens) and set a new box office record with 13 million tickets sold. The Host was quickly sold around the world, and US studio Universal bought the remake rights.

Bong, along with French film directors Michel Gondry and Leos Carax, directed a segment of Tokyo! (2008), a triptych feature telling three separate tales of the city. Bong's segment is about a man who has lived for a decade as a Hikikomori—the term used in Japan for people unable to adjust to society who do not leave their homes—and what happens when he falls in love with a pizza delivery girl.

Bong's fourth feature film Mother (2009) is the story of a doting mother who struggles to save her disabled son from a murder accusation. It premiered in the Un Certain Regard section at the 2009 Cannes Film Festival to much acclaim, particularly for actress Kim Hye-ja; she went on to win the Los Angeles Film Critics Association Award for Best Actress. Mother repeated its critical success locally and in the international film festival circuit. The film appeared on many film critics' "best-of" lists of 2010.

In 2011, Bong contributed to 3.11 A Sense of Home, another anthology film, each segment being 3 minutes and 11 seconds in duration, addressing the theme of home. The films were made by 21 filmmakers in response to the devastating earthquake and tsunami which hit the Tohoku region of Japan on March 11, 2011. The film screened on the first anniversary of the disaster. In Bong's short film Iki, a teenage girl finds a toddler, seemingly dead, on a beach.

That same year, Bong served as a jury member for the 27th Sundance Film Festival. He was also the head of the jury for the Caméra d'Or section of the 2011 Cannes Film Festival and 2013 Edinburgh International Film Festival.

American co-productions

Bong's first English-language film, Snowpiercer, was released in 2013. It is based on the graphic novel Le Transperceneige (1982) by Jacques Lob and Jean-Marc Rochette, and set largely on a futuristic train where those on board are separated according to their social status. The film premiered at Times Square on July 29, 2013, in Seoul, South Korea, before screening at the Deauville American Film Festival as the closing film on September 7, 2013, the Berlin International Film Festival as part of Berlin's Forum Sidebar on February 7, 2014, opening the LA Film Festival on June 11, 2014, and the Edinburgh International Film Festival on June 22, 2014. Upon release in cinemas, Snowpiercer was met with near-universal praise and strong ticket sales, both in South Korea and abroad. On the film review aggregator website Rotten Tomatoes, the film has an approval rating of 94% based on 253 reviews, with a weighted average of 8.10/10. The site's critical consensus reads: "Snowpiercer offers an audaciously ambitious action spectacular for filmgoers numb to effects-driven blockbusters." On Metacritic, the film has a score of 84 out of 100, based on 38 critics, indicating "universal acclaim". As of April 2014, it is the tenth highest-grossing domestic film in South Korea, with 9,350,141 admissions. The film also holds the domestic record for the fastest movie (domestic and foreign) to reach four million admissions, which it achieved in its fifth day after the premiere, and another record for the highest weekend figure (from Friday to Sunday) for a Korean film, with 2.26 million viewers. In addition to receiving several awards and nominations, Snowpiercer appeared on several critics' lists of the ten best films of 2014.

In 2015, Bong's next film, Okja, was announced. On April 30, 2015, screenwriter Jon Ronson announced on his Twitter account that he was writing the second draft of Bong's screenplay for the film. Darius Khondji joined the film as cinematographer in February 2016. Filming for the project began in April 2016. It premiered at the 2017 Cannes Film Festival, where it competed for the Palme d'Or and sparked controversy due to it being produced by Netflix. The film was met with boos, mixed with applause, during a press screening at the film festival, once the Netflix logo appeared on screen and again during a technical glitch; the film was projected in the incorrect aspect ratio for its first seven minutes. The festival later issued an apology to the filmmakers. However, despite the studio's negative response, the film itself received a four-minute standing ovation following its actual premiere. The film was later released on Netflix on June 28, 2017, and received positive reviews. On the film review aggregator website Rotten Tomatoes, the film has an approval rating of 86% based on 235 reviews, with a weighted average of 7.54/10. The site's critical consensus reads: "Okja sees Bong Joon Ho continuing to create defiantly eclectic entertainment – and still hitting more than enough of his narrative targets in the midst of a tricky tonal juggling act." On Metacritic, the film has a score of 75 out of 100, based on 36 critics, indicating "generally favorable reviews". New York Times critic A. O. Scott wrote: "Okja is a miracle of imagination and technique, and Okja insists, with abundant mischief and absolute sincerity, that she possesses a soul."

Parasite (2019)

In 2019, Bong directed the South Korean film Parasite, a black comedy thriller about a poor family that infiltrates a wealthy household by gaining employment as staff. The film premiered at the 2019 Cannes Film Festival, where it won the Palme d'Or, becoming the first Korean film to receive the award and the first film to do so with a unanimous vote since Blue Is the Warmest Colour at the 2013 Cannes Film Festival. On June 16, 2019, the film won the $60,000 Sydney Film Prize at the Sydney Film Festival where it was in competition alongside eleven other features from countries such as North Macedonia, Brazil and Spain, and Australian entrants Mirrah Foulkes (for Judy and Punch) and Ben Lawrence (for Hearts and Bones).

Parasite was released in South Korea by CJ Entertainment on May 30, 2019, and in the United States by Neon on October 11, 2019. It received unanimous critical acclaim and earned $266 million at the worldwide box office, becoming Bong's highest-grossing release. On the film review aggregator website Rotten Tomatoes, the film has an approval rating of 99% based on 451 reviews, with a weighted average of 9.37/10. The site's critical consensus reads: "An urgent, brilliantly layered look at timely social themes, Parasite finds writer-director Bong Joon Ho in near-total command of his craft." On Metacritic, the film has a score of 96 out of 100, based on 52 critics, indicating "universal acclaim". Regarding motivation of the film's creation, Bong hoped that he would live a comfortable life, however he was disappointed several times in reality. He wanted to express the anxiety, sadness, and deep fear that came from reality of life via his film.

Throughout the 2019–2020 film awards season, Bong and the film received numerous accolades. Bong received the Hollywood Filmmaker Award at the 23rd Hollywood Film Awards and Critics' Choice Movie Award for Best Director (tied with Sam Mendes for 1917) at the 25th Critics' Choice Awards. He was also nominated for Best Director and Best Screenplay (shared with Han Jin-won) at the 77th Golden Globe Awards, with the film itself winning Best Foreign Language Film. This was the first Golden Globe Award nomination (and win) for any South Korean film. Parasite also became the first non-English-language film to win the top prize at the 70th American Cinema Editors Eddie Awards when film editor Yang Jin-mo won Best Edited Feature Film – Dramatic. At the 26th Screen Actors Guild Awards, the cast of Parasite won the Screen Actors Guild Award for Outstanding Performance by a Cast in a Motion Picture, making history as the first foreign-language film to win in the category. At the 73rd British Academy Film Awards, Parasite was nominated in four categories, winning two awards—Best Original Screenplay and Best Film Not in the English Language.

Parasite was later submitted as the South Korean entry for Best International Feature Film for the 92nd Academy Awards, making the December shortlist. It eventually became the first South Korean film to receive an Academy Award nomination in any category, receiving a total of six nominations and winning four awards—Best Picture, Best Director, Best Original Screenplay, and Best International Feature Film. This was also the first time a non-English language film won the Academy Award for Best Picture and the first time Asian writers won Academy Awards for screenwriting. While accepting the Academy Award for Best Director, Bong expressed his deep respect and appreciation for fellow nominees Martin Scorsese, who inspired his work, and Quentin Tarantino, who supported and praised his earlier films. He also mentioned a quote from Scorsese—"The most personal is the most creative"—that also inspired him, which prompted the audience to give Scorsese an enthusiastic standing ovation. Scorsese later wrote and sent a heartfelt letter to Bong after Parasites Oscar success. Parasites Best Picture win was well received by film critics, who hailed it as a major step forward for popular appreciation of international film and for restoring the legitimacy of the Academy. "The academy gave best picture to the actual best picture", wrote Justin Chang of the Los Angeles Times, who continued that the film awards body was "startled ... into recognizing that no country's cinema has a monopoly on greatness". Conversely, U.S. president Donald Trump lambasted Parasites win at a campaign rally in Colorado on February 20, 2020, questioning why a foreign film won Best Picture; his comments were widely condemned as "xenophobic" and "racist". Distribution company Neon responded by tweeting: "Understandable, he can't read."

In January 2020, an HBO six-hour limited series based on the film, with Bong and Adam McKay serving as executive producers, currently in early development, was announced as an upcoming project. Bong has stated that the series, also titled Parasite, will explore stories "that happen in between the sequences in the film". In February 2020, Mark Ruffalo was rumored to star while Tilda Swinton was confirmed to being cast as the female lead. In September 2021, Bong served as jury president of the 78th Venice International Film Festival.

Upcoming projects 
In February 2021, Bong said that he had been working on two scripts after completing Parasite, one in English and one in Korean, and that he had finished one of the two. He said that the Korean film "is located in Seoul and has unique elements of horror and action" and that the English film is "a drama film based on a true event that happened in 2016."

Bong is preparing for a Korean animation as one of his next films. This animation was conceived since 2018 and said it is a Korean project that is a drama genre involving deep-sea creatures and humans.

In January 2022, it was revealed Bong's next film would be Mickey 17, an adaptation of Edward Ashton's novel Mickey7. Bong was given an advance manuscript of the novel in late 2021. The film, which was written, co-produced and directed by Bong, will be distributed by Warner Bros. Pictures and will star Robert Pattinson, Bong's first collaborations with both. In May 2022, Naomi Ackie, Toni Collette, and Mark Ruffalo joined the cast and the film is entered in pre-production at Warner Bros. Studios, Leavesden. In July 2022, Steven Yeun joined the cast. Production commenced on August 1, 2022.

Inspirations and style
As a child, Bong watched Black Orpheus (1959), which made a big impact on him, on Korean television. While he was in film school, Bong watched the Qatsi trilogy (1982–2002). His main inspirations are from Guillermo del Toro—his favorite films of del Toro's are The Devil's Backbone (2001) and Pan's Labyrinth (2006)—and Nagisa Ōshima, describing Oshima as "one of the most controversial masters". Bong also studied the films of Martin Scorsese and cited him as one of his major influences during his acceptance speech for the Academy Award for Best Director when he won for Parasite (2019). His process when working with actors is to make them feel comfortable and gives them a high amount of freedom when performing, even allowing them to improvise. Bong has commented that he doesn't like the term 'Directing Actors' as he feels that "acting is the actor's job and it's something I don't feel like I can direct".

The most defining trademark of Bong's films are their sudden tone shifts (sometimes within scenes) between drama, darkness, and black or slapstick humor. During a TIFF Master Class at the 2017 Toronto International Film Festival, Bong claimed: "I'm never really conscious of the tone shifts or the comedy that I apply, I never think 'oh, the tone shifts at this point or it's funny at this point.' I'm never conscious of it during the filmmaking or screenwriting process." Bong also uses real filming locations or specially built sets in all his films as opposed to green screens, even to the extent of filming in Seoul's sewers for The Host (2006); Memories of Murder (2003) set a local record for the number of locations it used.

In an interview promoting Snowpiercer (2013), actor Ed Harris described Bong's shooting process as "cutting while filming". Harris also said that "if I was doing a scene and it was a couple of pages long, he would never shoot the whole thing one way. He'd shoot a few lines, like the first beat of the scene, and then he would turn the camera around and get my part for that part of the scene. Then he would change the angle a little bit". He additionally noted that "the editor was sitting right there on the stage, right below the set with a big tent, actually getting the footage as they were filming. Fellow actor Daniel Henshall echoed Harris' sentiment calling Bong "precise" and "very sure of what he wants". Henshall continued by saying: "He only shoots what he's going to use in the edit. Doesn't do any coverage. I've never worked like that before. You're trimming the fat before you've shot it, which is very brave, because when you get into the edit, if something's missing you haven't got it. He's been planning it for four years that meticulously."

Personal life

Bong was a member of the now-defunct New Progressive Party. He has also voiced support for its predecessor, the Democratic Labor Party.

Bong has been married to screenwriter Jung Sun-young since 1995. Their son, Hyo-min, is also a filmmaker and directed the web movie Wedding Ceremony (2017).

Bong was named No. 1 Favorite Film Director among the most respected figures of college students nationwide from 2009 to 2019 in Korea.

Filmography

Awards and nominations

See also
 Cinema of Korea

References

External links

 
 Bong Joon-ho on KMDb

1969 births
Living people
Best Directing Academy Award winners
Best Director Paeksang Arts Award (film) winners
Best Original Screenplay Academy Award winners
Best Original Screenplay BAFTA Award winners
Directors of Best Foreign Language Film Academy Award winners
Directors of Palme d'Or winners
Filmmakers who won the Best Foreign Language Film BAFTA Award
New Progressive Party (South Korea)
South Korean progressives
South Korean socialists
People from Daegu
Producers who won the Best Picture Academy Award
South Korean film directors
South Korean film producers
South Korean screenwriters
Writers Guild of America Award winners
Yonsei University alumni
Recipients of the Ho-Am Prize in the Arts
Grand Prize Paeksang Arts Award (Film) winners